Howes  is an English topographic name and surname. Howes is from the plural of the word howe referring to a barrow originating from the Old Norse word haugr meaning hill, mound or barrow. Howes can refer to:

People
 Alex Howes (born 1988), road racing cyclist
 Alex Howes (footballer) (born 2000), English footballer
 Arthur Howes (1950–2004), documentary film maker and teacher
 Barbara Howes (1905–1996), American poet
 Bob Howes (born 1943), Canadian footballer
 Bobby Howes (1895–1972), English actor
 Brian Howes (born 1965), Canadian musician
 Buster Howes (born 1960), Royal Marines officer
 Carol Howes (born 1984), Zambian footballer
 Christian Howes (disambiguation), several
 Christian Howes (musician) (born 1972), American musician, educator, and composer
 Christopher Howes (born 1942), English academic
 Clifton A. Howes (1860–1936), American philatelist
 Daniel Howes, business columnist and editor
 Dean Howes (born 1952), American Major League Soccer executive
 Dulcie Howes (1908–1993), South African ballet dancer
 Edith Howes (1872–1954), New Zealand teacher and author
 Edmund Howes, an English chronicler
 Edward Howes (1813–1871), English politician
 Frank Howes (1891–1974), chief music critic of The Times in the 1950s and '60s
 George Howes (disambiguation), several
 George Howes (entomologist) (1879–1946), New Zealand entomologist
 Greg Howes (born 1977), American soccer player
 Howes Brothers, American commercial photography
 Ida Soule Howes (1869–1952), Washington state political and social activist.
 James G. Howes, American businessman
 Jimmy Howes (born 1961), American radio personality
 John Howes (1924–2017), professor
 John Howes (born 1964) Welsh ecologist and environmentalist
 Jonathan Howes (1937–2015), American politician and urban planner
 Justin Howes (1963–2005), British historian
 Kenny Howes (born 1970), American musician
 Larry Howes (born 1947), American politician
 Laura Howes, American scholar
 Paul Howes (born 1981), Australian trade unionists
 Peter Howes (1911–2003), Anglican bishop in Malaysia
 Reed Howes (1900–1964), American model and actor
 Ronald Howes (1926–2010), American inventor
 Royce Howes (1901–1973), journalist and author
 Ruth Howes (born 1944), American physicist
 Sally Ann Howes (1930–2021), English singer and actress
 Scott Howes (born 1987), ice hockey forward
 Thomas Howes (disambiguation), several people
 Tim Howes (born 1963), American computer scientist
 William S. Howes (1926–2000), farmer, municipal secretary, and political figure
 William Washington Howes (1887–1962), assistant Postmaster General

Places
 Howes, Cambridgeshire, a former hamlet in England
 C. G. Howes Dry Cleaning-Carley Real Estate, historic building in Newton, Massachusetts
 Fort Howes, a civilian redoubt
 Howes Building, a historic building in Clinton, Iowa, United States
 Howes (fell), a subsidiary summit of Branstree in the English Lake District, and one of The Outlying Fells of Lakeland
 Howes, Missouri, an unincorporated community
 Howes, South Dakota, community in Meade County, South Dakota, United States
 Sour Howes, small fell in the English Lake District

Other
 Howes Lubricator, manufacturer of oils, fuel additives and lubricants

See also
 Howe (disambiguation)
 Howe (surname)

English-language surnames